This article describes the qualification for the 2014 European Women's Handball Championship.

Qualification system

Draw and format
The draw was held at the Veszprém Aréna in Veszprém, Hungary on 26 May 2013 at 17:00 local time. Hungary and Croatia as host nations were directly qualified.
26 teams had registered for participation and compete for 14 places at the final tournament in the qualification. The teams were divided into several pots according to their positions in the EHF National Team Ranking.

The two top ranked teams advanced to the final tournament.

Seeding

Groups

Group 1

Group 2

Group 3

Group 4

Group 5

Group 6

Group 7

References

External links
 Eurohandball Site 

Qualification
Europe Women's Championship qualification
Europe Women's Championship qualification
Qualification for handball competitions